In Greek mythology, Thasus or Thasos ( or ; Ancient Greek: Θάσος) was a son of Poseidon (or, in other versions, Agenor, Phoenix or Cilix). In the stories, he was a Phoenician prince and one of those who set out from Phoenicia in search of Europa (Thasus' sister). His brother, Cadmus, gave him a part of the army and left him on an island (i.e. Thasos) where he "founded" the eponymous town of Thasos.

Notes

References
Apollodorus, The Library with an English Translation by Sir James George Frazer, F.B.A., F.R.S. in 2 Volumes, Cambridge, MA, Harvard University Press; London, William Heinemann Ltd. 1921. . Online version at the Perseus Digital Library. Greek text available from the same website.
Conon, Fifty Narrations, surviving as one-paragraph summaries in the Bibliotheca (Library) of Photius, Patriarch of Constantinople translated from the Greek by Brady Kiesling. Online version at the Topos Text Project.
Herodotus, The Histories with an English translation by A. D. Godley. Cambridge. Harvard University Press. 1920. . Online version at the Topos Text Project. Greek text available at Perseus Digital Library.
Pausanias, Description of Greece with an English Translation by W.H.S. Jones, Litt.D., and H.A. Ormerod, M.A., in 4 Volumes. Cambridge, MA, Harvard University Press; London, William Heinemann Ltd. 1918. . Online version at the Perseus Digital Library
Pausanias, Graeciae Descriptio. 3 vols. Leipzig, Teubner. 1903.  Greek text available at the Perseus Digital Library.

Children of Poseidon
Demigods in classical mythology
Agenorides
Princes in Greek mythology
Phoenician characters in Greek mythology
Mythology of Macedonia (region)
Ancient Thasos